Union Bank Limited is a fourth-generation private Islamic bank in Bangladesh. It is listed on the Dhaka Stock Exchange.

History 
Union Bank Limited was established on 7 March 2013 as a sharia-compliant bank. It signed an agreement to use products of Millennium Information Solution Limited.

On 8 January 2017, Islami Bank Bangladesh Ltd appointed Md Abdul Hamid Miah, former managing director of Union Bank, as managing director. This happened at a time Islami Bank Bangladesh Ltd saw major changes in ownership with companies aligned with S. Alam Group of Industries were allegedly buying up stakes in Islami Bank. The chairman of Union Bank at that time Shahidul Alam is a director of S Alam Group and brother of the chairman of S Alam Group, Mohammad Saiful Alam Masud Chowdhury.

ABM Mokammel Hoque Chowdhury was appointed managing director of Union Bank Limited on 22 April 2020 from additional managing director.

On 5 September 2021, Bangladesh Securities and Exchange Commission approved the Union Bank Limited plan to go for IPO. Union Bank 4.28 billion taka from the stock market which would make it the fourth largest IPO in the history of Bangladesh and the largest for the banking sector in the country.

On 23 September 2021, an inspection by Bangladesh Bank found that the bank overstated the cash in its vault of Gulshan branch by 190 million out of a total of 310 million taka. Deputy managing director of Union Bank Limited, Hasan Iqbal, said that the missing cash was given to a "VIP client" after regular hours. The bank suspended three of its officials after the discovery was made. Bangladesh Bank did not take any punitive action against Union Bank Limited for the mismatch of funds in its Gulshan Branch despite it being a violation of Banking rules. It has sent a letter to Union Bank seeking an explanation for the mismatch.

Union Bank planned to release shares on the Dhaka Stock Exchange on 26 January 2022. BRAC EPL Investments Limited and Prime Bank Investment Limited were the issue managers of the bank. On 30 June 2022, an investigation by Bangladesh Bank found that the Bank had provided majority of its loans to 300 companies that exist only on paper and some of whom are not even registered as businesses in Bangladesh.

References 

Banks of Bangladesh
Banks established in 2013
2013 establishments in Bangladesh
Companies listed on the Dhaka Stock Exchange
Organisations based in Dhaka